Marakei Airport  is the airport serving Marakei, Kiribati. It is located on the northern tip of the atoll, near the village of Rawannawi.

The airport is served by Air Kiribati from Abaiang.

Airlines and destinations

Notes

Airports in Kiribati